Nebria formosana is a species of ground beetle in the Nebriinae subfamily that can be found in China and Taiwan.

References

formosana
Beetles described in 1981
Beetles of Asia
Endemic fauna of China